The 20815 / 20816 Visakhapatnam - Tatanagar Weekly Superfast Express is an intercity train of the Indian Railways connecting Visakhapatnam Junction in Andhra Pradesh and Tatanagar of Jharkhand. It is currently being operated with 20816/20815 train numbers on a weekly basis.

Service

The 20816/Visakhapatnam - Tatanagar Weekly SF Express has an average speed of 57 km/hr and covers 865 km in 15 hrs 05 mins. 20815/Tatanagar - Visakhapatnam Weekly SF Express has an average speed of 56 km/hr and covers 865 km in 15 hrs 25 mins.

Route & Halts

Coach Composition

The train had standard LHB rakes with a max speed of 130 kmph. The train consists of 21 coaches:

 1 AC II Tier
 3 AC III Tier
 11 Sleeper Coaches
 4 General
 1 Divyangjan cum Guard Coach
 1 Generator Car

Traction

Train is hauled by a Visakhapatnam Loco Shed based WAP-7 Locomotive.

Notes

External links 

 12743/Visakhapatnam - Tatanagar Weekly SF Express
 12744/Tatanagar - Visakhapatnam Weekly SF Express

References 

Express trains in India
Rail transport in Andhra Pradesh
Rail transport in Odisha
Rail transport in Jharkhand
Transport in Visakhapatnam
Transport in Jamshedpur